The 2016–17 Segona Divisió, also known as the Lliga Biosphere, was the 18th season of second-tier football in Andorra. This season began on 25 September 2016 and ended on 21 May 2017.

Format

For this season, the league was contested between ten clubs. The clubs played each other twice totaling 18 matches each. The leaders at this point were to be promoted to the Primera Divisió next season with the second placed club to participate in a play-off match for a place in next season's Primera Divisió. The four "B" teams cannot be promoted. After the regular season a play-off round between the non-B clubs began. Each club will play the others once with the regular season records being carried over.

League table

Results

Play–off round

Play–off results

See also
2016–17 Primera Divisió
2017 Copa Constitució

References

External links
 

Segona Divisió seasons
2016–17 in Andorran football
Andorra